Adam James Powell (born 20 December 1976) is a Welsh computer programmer, game designer and businessman.  He is the co-founder of Neopets and Meteor Games.

Career
Powell attended the University of Nottingham from 1995 to 1998 studying for a computer science degree.  During his time at Nottingham, Powell created Dark Heart released in 1996, a popular MUD based on the DikuMUD code.

In 1997, Powell started Shout! Advertising, a UK-based advertising company which operated the third largest click-through program on the Internet by mid-1999. He also co-founded Netmagic, a successful business which designed and sold online banner advertising. Then in July 1999, he founded Powlex, which focused on web page design.

Neopets
Powell first had the idea of Neopets in 1997, while studying at the University of Nottingham.
He and Donna Powell (formerly Donna Williams) started programming the site in September 1999, and launched the site two months later on 15 November 1999. Powell programmed the entire site, and created most of the original activities and games.

In April 2000, Powell negotiated a significant investment in Neopets.com and transferred the company from the UK to Los Angeles, US.  After the relocation, Powell remained on staff as creative director and technical lead. Under Powell's management, Neopets went from its initial launch to over 140 million accounts and 5 billion pageviews per month. On 20 June 2005, Viacom bought Neopets, Inc. for US$160 million.

Powell continued to work for Neopets.com until June 2007, aiding the transition following the purchase and continuing to develop high-end concepts for the site.

Powell has creative design and writing credits on a wide variety of Neopets products including SCEA's 2006 PlayStation Portable release Neopets: Petpet Adventures: The Wand of Wishing, Wizards of the Coast September 2003 release the Neopets Trading Card Game and Sony Computer Entertainment America Inc's 2005 release Neopets: The Darkest Faerie, for the PlayStation 2.

Meteor Games
In 2007, Adam and Donna Powell founded Meteor Games, an independent online gaming studio committed to developing immersive and innovative games spanning the web, social networks, and mobile devices. As of February 2011 Meteor Games hadn't raised any venture capital and was profitable

Meteor Games' first project was Twin Skies, a 3D MMO that blended casual gaming and social networking elements with traditional massively multiplayer online role-playing games. Meteor Games released their first web-based game Vikings, Pirates and Ninjas in March 2009. The game was free to play on the web and Facebook.

In the company's shift to the rapidly growing social gaming market it released several games based on internal intellectual property including: Island Paradise which became a large commercial success, Serf Wars, and Ranch Town.

Meteor Games is headquartered in Los Angeles and has 100 employees.

Late in December 2011, Meteor Games laid off 90% of its staff, shut down the Viacom-backed game "Treasure Keepers", and subsequently wound down all operations.

Moglings
Around June 2013, Adam stated that he, Donna, and TPOSG would be making a new game. In Donna's Reddit AMA, she said that the tentative title would be Moglings, and development would start in 2015. On September 22, 2014, Adam stated in a post to the Moglings subreddit that the project would be suspended for some time, perhaps to be taken up again in early 2016.

References

1976 births
Living people
Alumni of the University of Nottingham
British video game designers
Neopets
British game designers
Welsh chief executives
Welsh computer programmers
Welsh inventors
21st-century British inventors